Lee Ka Man (born 28 November 1986) is a rower born in British Hong Kong, who won the silver medal at the 2006 Asian Games in the lightweight single sculls class.  She also competed at the 2008 Beijing Olympic Games in the Women's Single Sculls.

References

Living people
1986 births
Hong Kong female rowers
Rowers at the 2008 Summer Olympics
Rowers at the 2016 Summer Olympics
Olympic rowers of Hong Kong
Place of birth missing (living people)
Asian Games medalists in rowing
Rowers at the 2002 Asian Games
Rowers at the 2006 Asian Games
Rowers at the 2010 Asian Games
Rowers at the 2014 Asian Games
Rowers at the 2018 Asian Games
Asian Games silver medalists for Hong Kong
Asian Games bronze medalists for Hong Kong
Medalists at the 2006 Asian Games
Medalists at the 2014 Asian Games
Medalists at the 2018 Asian Games